Rudayan may refer to places in India:

 Rudayan, Budaun, Uttar Pradesh
 Rudayan, Hathras, Uttar Pradesh